The climate of Istanbul, classified variously as Mediterranean, oceanic, or a transitional climate in between the two, is temperate; with cool, frequently rainy, somewhat snowy winters, and warm to hot, moderately dry summers. Strongly influenced by the Sea of Marmara to the south and the Black Sea to the north, it is thoroughly maritime; precipitation is moderately high, fog is frequent, and seasonal lag is noticeable both in winter and in summer. The city is sheltered from both extreme heat and frigid temperatures, with temperatures rarely reaching  or dipping below .

Precipitation is unevenly distributed, with winter generally experiencing very frequent precipitation, while summers are generally dry, punctuated by infrequent showers. Cloudiness also varies drastically by season; while the city has winters that receive less than one fifth of the possible sunshine duration, comparable to cities in northwestern Europe, in summer the city gets considerably more sunshine than most of Western and Central Europe.

Istanbul's climate is rapidly changing due to the combined effects of climate change and the city's urban heat island. Recent data shows an immense increase in daily low temperatures, and some increase in daily highs.

General climate

Temperature 
Unsurprisingly, Istanbul's temperature range is narrow for a non-oceanside locale. This is largely due to the city's narrow diurnal temperature range, as Istanbul's hottest days are generally milder than other cities with similar daytime temperatures, such as Portland, despite having a larger annual temperature range. The dominant northeasterly loses its dry quality in this time of year, giving way to a more moist wind flow, termed Poyraz (ultimately from ) from the same direction, causing persistent precipitation, sometimes in the form of snow; although still incapable of producing extreme cold due to its maritime nature. The Lodos (ultimately from ) is the southwesterly, warm and dry airflow "competing" with the northeasterly Poyraz, and is responsible for the occasional day above  in the city, as well as numerous severe windstorms. Therefore, while warmth records in winter are usually associated with and always colloquially blamed on the Lodos, cold records are the product of rare windless nights.

Spring and fall are mild, with transitional qualities between summer and winter; spring is generally colder than fall due to seasonal lag, but both score highly on comfort indices.

The same pattern is not found to the same extent in winter, where temperatures have seen no perceptible increase until very recently. This points to the combined effect of climate change and the urban heat island.

Precipitation 

Istanbul's precipitation varies considerably between years and districts. Furthermore, during early and mid-winter, the city's frequency of precipitation is virtually unparalleled in the Mediterranean basin; January averages 20 days of precipitation when counting trace accumulations, 17 when using a 0.1 mm threshold, and 12 when using a 1.0 mm threshold, on par with cities such as Brussels, and rainier than famously humid locales in Western Europe, such as London.Rain remains the dominant form of precipitation throughout the year, with snow representing only one fourth of precipitation even in the coldest months of January and February. Snowfall varies widely between years and different areas of the city, with districts facing north more prone to receive snow than southerly ones. This effect is largely caused by lake-effect snow, which forms when cold air, originating from the North Pole or Siberia, develops into moist and unstable air that ascends to form snow squalls along the lee shores of the Black Sea, upon contact with the relatively warm water. It is also important to note that almost half of snowy periods do not leave accumulated snow for more than a day, reducing the 'number of days with snow cover' statistic, published daily by the TSMS, by half.

Particularly severe winter storms have included January 1942, March 1987, and most recently January 2017 and 2022.

Normally uncommon precipitation types, especially graupel (or ) are a staple of winter due to insufficient cooling of the southern Black Sea, somewhat well-known internationally for delaying a Champions League match between Galatasaray and Juventus.

Sunshine and cloudiness 

Istanbul's sunshine is profoundly seasonal, with cloudy winters and mostly sunny summers. Yearly, it averages around 2000 hours of sunshine, a midway point between the Mediterranean and oceanic regions of Europe.

In winter, the city is known for its persistently cloudy weather, with many regions getting less than 20 percent of their potential sunlight, and winter months of certain years getting less than 30 hours - equivalent to less than one tenth of possible sunshine. This brings Istanbul's sunshine hours to levels closer to Western Europe, while its generally sunny summers create a seasonal sunshine pattern perhaps most closely mirrored by Cascadia, specifically Seattle.Fog is known to be a major component limiting sunshine in Istanbul. Data before 1980 count annual foggy and misty days at above 200, and in some summer months, records show more than 25 days of fog and mist. This has had cultural implications, most famously on poetry; an "obstinate mist" symbolizes the persistently oppressive nature of Abdülhamid II's Istanbul in Tevfik Fikret's "The Fog".

However, fog has been steadily declining since the 1970s. Data from the 1980s show around 100 days of fog and mist, and this has declined to about 60 in the last 10 years. This is likely due to the city's urban heat island, which have been raising overnight temperatures since the city's initial expansion in the 1950s and 60s. While forested regions outside the city (especially in nearby Kocaeli Province) have lagged behind in the decrease of fog - the station in Gölcük had consistently been seeing over 200 days of fog until 1993, and now also averages around 60 - the decrease of fog poses a significant threat to the flora of the region, which feed on morning humidity in the relatively dry summer months.

Severe weather 
Istanbul's climate is generally not conducive to severe weather, due to its temperate climate, frequent but light rainfall and maritime heating and cooling. However, instances of severe weather do occur in Istanbul with some regularity, mostly in the form of heavy snow, severe thunderstorms and heatwaves.

Thunderstorms 

Istanbul experiences around 10–15 days of thunderstorms, with a primary peak in June, and another one in September. Unlike many central European cities, July and August are too dry to support a high amount of thunderstorms, and yet unlike many cities in the Mediterranean basin, winters are too cold and cloudy to support thunderstorms, causing two warm-season stormy periods with a summerly nadir inbetween.

A notable anomaly is the amount of strong to severe thunderstorms that occur yearly; about half of the thunderstorms that occur in the city can be qualified as such. These thunderstorms peak around early-fall, likely due to warmer waters; while their general commonality is likely due to high wind shear and other conditions conducive to severe storm development.

Tornadoes are uncommon, but not impossible, with recent storms in 2020 and 2021 dropping weak, non-damaging tornadoes.

Heat waves 

Due to its maritime position, Istanbul is not susceptible to heat waves by southern European standards. Not only do cities with cooler summers often have higher summer temperature records than Istanbul, Istanbul escapes heat-waves even when they happen over northwestern Turkey.

However, studies have shown that heatwaves, when they do happen, can and do cause excess death in the largely unprepared population. Four heat waves in the years 2013 to 2017, two of which happened in the year 2017, where every summer month anomalously experienced at least one day above , show that excess deaths do increase substantially during heatwaves.

Sea temperatures 
Unsurprisingly, Istanbul's sea temperatures are warmer than its climate, in accordance with its place in the general Mediterranean region; this generally means that places farther away from the sea experience colder weather, especially in winter. Its 'cool but not cold' winter sea temperatures also have a major effect on the city's precipitation, especially on sea-effect snow.

Classification 
The transitional nature of Istanbul's climate causes divergence in classification and nomenclature. According to Köppen and Trewartha, Istanbul has a borderline Mediterranean climate, humid subtropical climate and oceanic climate. Thornthwaite classifies most of the city as B1 B'2 s b'4, while the semi-official Atalay system classifies it as a Mediterranean-oceanic transitional climate. Other nomenclature used to classify the city include 'Temperate transitional climate and 'sub-continental-sub-Mediterranean transition climate'.

In stark contrast to the divergence in classification in generalist classifications, precipitation-based classifications generally concur that Istanbul is moist subhumid in the south and humid in the north. Only the Aydeniz aridity classification diverges from this, calling the city humid to perhumid', largely due to high relative humidity and fog.

It is known that Istanbul's climate classification, according to Köppen, has changed over the last century. Decadal trends and seminormals also indicate that by the new normals encompassing 2030, no part of Istanbul will have a warm-summer climate.

Areas and microclimates 

Because of its hilly topography and maritime influences, Istanbul exhibits a multitude of distinct microclimates.

Furthermore, while the city itself lies in USDA hardiness zones 9a to 9b, its inland suburbs lie in zone 8b with isolated pockets of zone 8a, restricting the cultivation of subtropical plants to the coasts.

Marmara coast 

The warmest and driest region of Istanbul, the Marmara coast is considered to have a Mediterranean climate by both Köppen and Trewartha. Bohn, however, considers the area sub-Mediterranean as with the rest of Istanbul, and comments that the region is "protected from cold winds due to their location on southern slopes at the sea, [has] very high water deficiency in summer." Thornthwaite also considers the region "s2", "with considerable summer drought".

The area largely lies in USDA hardiness zones 9a and 9b, with temperatures rarely falling below .

The area is also relatively snow-poor, with less than 10 days of snow in all parts of the region, around half of which accumulates and stays on the ground for more than a day.

Sunshine ranges from 2000 to 2300 hours, with a notable west-east gradient, the eastern side being more cloudy.

Inland from the Bosporus 
The climate near the Bosporus is cooler, wetter and cloudier, and represents a good average of the region of Istanbul. It is classified as humid subtropical by both Köppen and Trewartha, although non-urbanized and hilly regions are mostly oceanic, as was most of the region likely was before urbanization. Bohn further comments on this region by stating that, starting here, the precipitation regime is profoundly impacted by the Black Sea.

The lack of a real summer drought, with at least  of precipitation every month, further distinguishes this region from the south. Snowfall is generally plentiful, due to the relatively continental nature of the region.

Sunshine is a bit lower than the southern coast, usually around 2000–2200 hours, yet still higher than the northern coasts.

Black sea coast 

The Black Sea coast constitutes the still-oceanic part of Istanbul, with cooler temperatures especially in summer. Bohn characterizes it as a "moist-temperate climate by mostly north and northeastern winds by the Black Sea; [with] frequent formation of thew [sic] and mists in summer."

Winter averages depend on proximity to the coast; inland parts of the region have averages around  while coastal regions see winter temperatures close to the rest of the city. Accordingly, USDA hardiness zones are equally variable, from 9a around the coast to 8a in some inland valleys.

Rainy days, more plentiful than the rest of the city, show the usual east-west gradient; with Şile getting up to 15 days more precipitation than Bahçeköy. Also notable is the sheer frequency of precipitation in some areas, as Şile averages above 20 days of precipitation in December.

Snowfall is plentiful due to proximity to the Black Sea coast, although along the coast the snowy season is shorter, with only around 1 day of snow in March.

Sunshine data in this region is relatively scarce, but the station in Kumköy averages around 1800 hours of sunshine, making it the cloudiest recorded area of Istanbul.

See also 

 Climate of Turkey
 Climate change in Turkey
 SantralIstanbul

Notes

References 

Turkey
Climate